4C +37.11 or Galaxy 0402+379 is a radio galaxy and elliptical galaxy featuring binary supermassive black holes with the least separation of any directly observed binaries, as of 2006. The separation between the two is 24 light-years or 7.3 parsecs, with an orbital period of 30,000 years.  The two supermassive black holes, about 750 million light years from earth, have a combined mass of about 15 billion .

Other supermassive binary black hole candidates suggest the smaller separation distances expected as they eventually merge, but have not been confirmed. For example, quasar OJ 287 is inferred to have a binary supermassive black hole pair with an orbital period of 12 years, and thus be much closer together. However these have not been directly measured and additional observation, possibly over extended time periods, is needed.

The eventual collision of the pair, which should stay apart for at least a few million more years, would result in strong gravitational waves.

References 

 VLBA Reveals Closest Pair of Supermassive Black Holes (UNM Today) 2 May 2006
 A Compact Supermassive Black-Hole Binary System  (Los Alamos National Laborator - LANL)

External links 
 Black Hole Pair Sets Proximity Record (SPACE.com) 1 May 2006 02:04 pm ET
 Two black holes come oh-so-close (MSNBC) 5:23 p.m. ET 1 May 2006
 Colossal black holes seen in closest clinch yet (New Scientist) 16:02 21 April 2006
 A Supermassive Black Hole Pairing (Centauri Dreams)
 Scientists Find Closest Pair of Supermassive Black Holes (PhysOrg.com) 1 May 2006
 VLBA Reveals Closest Pair of Supermassive Black Holes (SpaceRef.com) Monday, 1 May 2006
 Closest-spaced giant black hole pair found (SpaceFlight Now) 1 May 2006

Perseus (constellation)
4C +37.11
Radio galaxies
Supermassive black holes
37.11
Principal Galaxies Catalogue objects